Kaingdaw is a village in Kyain Seikgyi Township, Kawkareik District, in the Kayin State of Myanmar. It is located on the left (western) bank of the Haungthayaw River.

References

External links
 "Kaingdaw Map — Satellite Images of Kaingdaw" Maplandia World Gazetteer

Populated places in Kayin State